Sally Perz is an American politician who was a member of the Ohio House of Representatives, serving from 1993 to 1999.

Career 
Beginning as a defender for women's rights, Perz's advocacy eventually led to politics. She later served as a business consultant. In 1992, she decided to run for a term in the Ohio House of Representatives and faced Don Czarcinski, a troubled incumbent. She ended up defeating Czarcinski to take her first term, and was reelected in 1994, 1996, and 1998. She resigned from the House in 1999 to pursue other ventures, and was succeeded by Jim Mettler.

References

External links 
 Profile on the Ohio Ladies' Gallery website

Republican Party members of the Ohio House of Representatives
Women state legislators in Ohio
Living people
Year of birth missing (living people)
21st-century American women